Following are the results of the Ukrainian Football Amateur League 2002 season.  Participation is restricted to the regional (Oblast) champions and/or the most regarded team by the respective regional association.

This season competition consisted of four stages as the previous. First two stages were organized in regional principal in groups of four or five and were played in two rounds where each team could play another at its home ground. The semifinals and finals, on the other hand, were played in one round and this year were organized in the city of Kakhovka. On the first stage each group winners and their immediate runners-up were to advance to the next part of the competition. Due to few teams joining the professional competition the format was adjusted and to the second stage only eleven teams advanced. The second stage was split in four groups where first two places were advancing to the semifinals. The semifinals, in their turn, were split in two groups where first two teams were advancing to the winners final of four.

Note: ZALK stands for the Zaporzhian Aliuminum Plant (Kombinat in Ukrainian).
KZEZO stands for the Kakhovkan Factory (Zavod) of Electro-Welding Equipment (Elektro-Zvariuvalnoho Obladnannia).

Teams

Location map

First stage
Note: Some records are not full.

Group A

Group B

Group C

Group D

Group E

Group F

Second stage

Group 1

Note: Mukacheve withdrew.

Group 2

Group 3

Group 4

Semifinals

Group 1

Group 2

Final Group

Ukrainian Football Amateur League seasons
Amateur
Amateur